Sunil Kumar Podder (born 1 February 1939) is an Indian molecular biologist and biophysicist, known for his biophysical studies on Ligand. Focusing his researches on the recognition processes in biological systems and its chemical specificity, he proposed a model for measuring the specificity using free energy of association of amino acids of proteins with nucleic acid bases. A former member of faculty at the department of biochemistry of the Indian Institute of Science where he taught from 1972 to 1997, and a life member of the Indian Biophysical Society, he has published several articles detailing his research findings in peer reviewed journals and has presented many papers. The Council of Scientific and Industrial Research, the apex agency of the Government of India for scientific research, awarded him the Shanti Swarup Bhatnagar Prize for Science and Technology, one of the highest Indian science awards, in 1982, for his contributions to biological sciences.

See also 
 Dipankar Chatterji

References 

Recipients of the Shanti Swarup Bhatnagar Award in Biological Science
1939 births
Living people
Indian molecular biologists
Indian biophysicists
Indian scientific authors
Academic staff of the Indian Institute of Science
20th-century Indian biologists